Jagged Little Pill Acoustic is a studio album by Alanis Morissette. It is a largely acoustic retrospective version of her highly successful third album, Jagged Little Pill (1995); the songs are stripped-down versions of the originals, though producer Glen Ballard has augmented them with studio production effects to create an alternative pop album. The album was released by Maverick Records in the United States on June 13, 2005 (the 10th anniversary of the original album), available only at North American Starbucks outlets until July 26, 2005, when it was made available in other retail stores.  This limited availability led to a dispute between Maverick Records and HMV Canada, who retaliated by removing from sale Morissette's other albums for the duration of Starbucks' exclusive month-long sale. The album's single in the U.S. was "Hand in My Pocket". The cover artwork is a sepia-toned tribute to the cover of the original Jagged Little Pill.

Track listing

Personnel
Alanis Morissette –   lead vocals, harmonica
David Levita –   guitars, marxophone, perapaloshka, mandolin
Blair Sinta –   drums, percussion, maraca, cajon
Zac Rae –   pianoforte, keyboards, organ, pump organ
Jason Orme –   guitars
Cedric Lemoyne –   bass
Glen Ballard –   string arrangements
Suzie Katayama –   string arrangements, conductor
Ralph Morrison –   violin I
Sara Parkins –   violin II
Roland Kato –   viola
Steve Erdody –   cello
Technical
Glen Ballard – producer
Bill Malina – mixing and recording

Charts

Album

Singles

Certifications

References

External links

2005 albums
Alanis Morissette albums
Maverick Records albums
Albums produced by Glen Ballard
Warner Records albums